Dennis Edozie  (10 November 1935 - 18 August 2018) was a Nigerian jurist who was Judge of the Supreme Court of Nigeria from 2003 until his retirement in 2005.

Law career
Edozie was a teacher of Latin and mathematics from 1956 to 1958, before entering the government of Eastern Nigeria as an administrative officer from 1962 to 1965.
He served as a judge of the High Court of Anambra State from 1982 to 1990, and then proceeded to the Court of Appeal, where he was a judge for twelve years from 1990 until his appointment to the Supreme Court in 2003.

References

1935 births
2018 deaths
Chief justices of Nigeria
Nigerian jurists